Lev Genrikhovich Schnirelmann (also Shnirelman, Shnirel'man; ; 2 January 1905 – 24 September 1938) was a Soviet mathematician who worked on number theory, topology and differential geometry.

Work
Schnirelmann sought to prove Goldbach's conjecture. In 1930, using the Brun sieve, he proved that any natural number greater than 1 can be written as the sum of not more than C prime numbers, where C is an effectively computable constant.

His other fundamental work is joint with Lazar Lyusternik.  Together, they developed the Lusternik–Schnirelmann category, as it is called now, based on the previous work by Henri Poincaré, George David Birkhoff, and Marston Morse. The theory gives a global invariant of spaces, and has led to advances in differential geometry and topology. They also proved the theorem of the three geodesics, that a Riemannian manifold topologically equivalent to a sphere has at least three simple closed geodesics.

Biography
Schnirelmann graduated from Moscow State University in 1925 and then worked at the Steklov Mathematical Institute from 1934 to 1938. His advisor was Nikolai Luzin.

Schnirelmann committed suicide in Moscow on 24 September 1938, for reasons  that are not clear. According to Lev Pontryagin's memoir from 1998, Schnirelmann gassed himself, due to depression brought on by feelings of inability to work at the same high level as earlier in his career. On the other hand, according to an interview Eugene Dynkin gave in 1988, Schnirelman took his own life after the NKVD tried to recruit him as an informer.

See also
Inscribed square problem
Schnirelmann density
Schnirelmann's constant
Schnirelmann's theorem

References

Further reading

External links
 
Lev Genrihovich Schnirelmann, a popular article by V. Tikhomirov and V. Uspensky 

1905 births
1938 suicides
People from Gomel
People from Gomelsky Uyezd
Belarusian Jews
Soviet mathematicians
Number theorists
Topologists
Differential geometers
20th-century Belarusian mathematicians
Moscow State University alumni
Academic staff of Moscow State University
Corresponding Members of the USSR Academy of Sciences
Suicides in the Soviet Union
Suicides by gas